The 2019 NRL Women's Premiership was the second season of professional women's rugby league in Australia.

Teams

Pre-season

Regular season

The season again operated under a round-robin format, with games played as curtain-raisers to the 2019 NRL Finals Series as well as two standalone matches. The top two finishing teams will then contest the Grand Final, which is to be played before the men's Grand Final on 6 October.

Ladder

Ladder progression 

 Numbers highlighted in green indicate that the team finished the round inside the top two.
 Numbers highlighted in blue indicates the team finished first on the ladder in that round.
 Numbers highlighted in red indicates the team finished last place on the ladder in that round.

Grand Final

Individual awards

Dally M Medal Awards Night 
The following award was presented at the Dally M Medal Awards ceremony in Sydney on the night of 2 October 2019.

Dally M Medal Player of the Year: Jessica Sergis ( St. George Illawarra Dragons)

Grand Final Day Awards 
The following awards were presented at ANZ Stadium on Grand Final day, 6 October 2019.

Veronica White Medal: Honey Hireme ( New Zealand Warriors).

Karyn Murphy Medal Player of the Match: Annette Brander ( Brisbane Broncos)

Statistical Awards 
Highest Point Scorer in Regular Season: Maddie Studdon ( St. George Illawarra Dragons) 14 (7g)

Top Try Scorers in Regular Season: Jessica Sergis ( St. George Illawarra Dragons) 3

Highest Point Scorer across the Full Season: Maddie Studdon ( St. George Illawarra Dragons) 16 (8g)

Top Try Scorer across the Full Season: Jessica Sergis ( St. George Illawarra Dragons) 3

Postseason
In October 2018, NRL announced the inaugural edition of Rugby League World Cup 9s in Western Sydney on 18–19 October 2019, featuring 12 international men's teams and 4 women's teams.  This would be around one month after the Women's Grand Final and replaced the Auckland Nines which had been run as a preseason tournament in previous years.

References

External links